The Khivan Revolution refers to the events of 1917–1924 in the Khanate of Khiva (then KNSR and the HSSR), which led to the liquidation of the Khanate in Khiva, the establishment of the Khorezm People's Soviet Republic (with the intervention of the Red Army), and the subsequent inclusion of the republic into the USSR through national disengagement and the formation of the Uzbek SSR and the Turkmen SSR in 1924.

Khiva Khanate in 1917–1920

Khiva, the Provisional Government of Russia, and the October Revolution (1917)
From 1910 to 1918, the Khanate was ruled by Isfandiyar Khan. An attempt to hold liberal reforms after the February Revolution of 1917, the abdication of Nicholas II and the coming to power of the Provisional Government in Russia failed, in particular, because of the conservative views of Isfandiyar Khan, who began to hinder these reforms. Discontent began to ripen in the Khanate, it got especially intensified after the October Revolution in Russia and the publication of progressive decrees (Land Decree) by the Bolsheviks, which was learned about in Khiva. The independence of the Khiva Khanate was recognized by the Provisional Government, and by the RSFSR after the October Revolution and the liquidation of the Provisional Government.

The coup in Khiva (1918)
Dissatisfaction with Isfandiyar-Khan’s policy greatly increased by 1918 and in the spring of 1918, the leader of Turkmen-Yomud, Junaid Khan, organized a military coup, overthrew Isfandiyar-Khan and seized power in Khiva almost without resistance. A relative of Isfandiyar Khan, Sayid Abdullah became a Khan (1918–1920).

Khiva Khanate in 1918–1920
The actual dictatorship of Junaid Khan and his aggressive foreign policy led the country to terrible military defeats, which further intensified dissent in the Khanate and emigration from it. In 1918, the Khorezm Communist Party was established outside of Khiva. It was small (by November 1919 there were about 600 people), but it was the party that later (albeit with great help from the RSFSR) would become the force that overthrew the monarchy in Khiva.   was one of the activists of the Young Khivans movement.

Khiva state in 1920–1924

The liquidation of the Khiva Khanate and the establishment of the Khorezm People's Soviet Republic (1920)
The internal contradictions in the Khiva Khanate intensified, and in November 1919 an uprising led by the Communists began in the Khiva Khanate. However, the forces of the rebels were not enough to defeat government forces. Red Army troops from Russia were sent to help the rebels. By early February 1920, the army of Junaid Khan was completely defeated. On February 2, Said Abdullah Khan abdicated the throne, and on April 26, 1920, the Khorezm People's Soviet Republic was proclaimed as part of the RSFSR.

Results of the revolution in Khiva
As a result of the revolution, the monarchy was overthrown in Khiva (1920), a republic was proclaimed, and later it became part of the USSR

Sources
 Essays on the history of the Karakalpak Autonomous Soviet Socialist Republic, vol. 2 (1917–1963). Tashkent, 1964, page 68.
 Kuzmin S. 2018. Mechanisms for the elimination of monarchies in the countries of Inner Asia in the first half of the twentieth century. // Religion and society in the East. Issue 2, pages 188–45.

Khanate of Khiva
Russian Civil War
1910s in Asia
1920s in Asia